Kreshnik Hajrizi (born 28 May 1999) is a professional footballer who plays as a centre-back for Swiss club Lugano. Born in Switzerland, he plays for the Kosovo national team.

Club career

Chiasso
On 19 June 2019, Hajrizi joined Swiss Challenge League side Chiasso. One month later, he made his debut in a 0–1 home defeat against Wil after coming on as a substitute at 74th minute in place of Ivan Lurati.

Lugano
On 25 March 2021, Hajrizi via a photo on his official Instagram account announces that from the 2021–22 season, he will be part of the Swiss Super League club Lugano. Four months later, he made his debut in a 0–2 home defeat against Zürich after being named in the starting line-up.

International career

Youth
During the 2015–16 season, Hajrizi has been part of Switzerland at youth international level, respectively part of national under-17 team and he played twelve games with this team and scored two goals. On 4 October 2018, he received a call-up from Kosovo U21 for the 2019 UEFA European Under-21 Championship qualification match against Israel U21, and made his debut after coming on as a substitute at 46th minute in place of Fuad Rahimi.

Senior
On 11 November 2022, Hajrizi received a call-up from Kosovo for the friendly matches against Armenia and Faroe Islands. His debut with Kosovo came eight days later in a friendly match against Faroe Islands after being named in the starting line-up.

Honours
Lugano
Swiss Cup: 2021–22

Career statistics

Club

References

External links

1999 births
Living people
People from Sierre
Sportspeople from Valais
Association football central defenders
Kosovan footballers
Kosovo under-21 international footballers
Swiss men's footballers
Switzerland youth international footballers
Swiss people of Kosovan descent
Swiss people of Albanian descent
Swiss Challenge League players
FC Chiasso players
Swiss Super League players
FC Lugano players
Kosovo international footballers